Hohenhof is a 1908-built Art Nouveau villa, located within Gartenstadt Hohenhagen in the city of Hagen, Germany. The villa was designed by Belgian architect Henry van de Velde as a Gesamtkunstwerk - incorporating shell, accessories, furnishings, landscape and all into the building's design. 

The client, German industrialist and arts patron Karl Ernst Osthaus, used the building as his family home until his death in 1921. His children sold the estate to the city of Hagen under the condition to maintain the overall design character. Already beginning in the early 1920s and until the late 1970s, the mansion underwent a number of use-changes. Since then it has been renovated and today houses a publicly open museum.

See also  
 Karl Ernst Osthaus-Museum

References

External links  
 
 Hohenhof-Homepage

Museums in North Rhine-Westphalia
Art Nouveau architecture in Germany
Houses completed in 1908
Buildings and structures in Hagen
Villas in Germany
Art museums and galleries in Germany
Art Nouveau houses
Henry van de Velde buildings
1908 establishments in Germany